The Shire of Flinders is a local government area in north-western Queensland, Australia.

The Shire, named for the Flinders River, is predominantly a grazing area with cattle in the north of the shire and mixed grazing to the south in  the black soil area.

History 
Jirandali (also known as Yirandali, Warungu, Yirandhali) is an Australian Aboriginal language of North-West Queensland, particularly the Hughenden area. The language region includes the local government area of the Shire of Flinders, including Dutton River, Flinders River, Mount Sturgeon, Caledonia, Richmond, Corfield, Winton, Torrens, Tower Hill, Landsborough Creek, Lammermoor Station, Hughenden, and Tangorin.
The Hughenden Division was established on 20 July 1882 under the Divisional Boards Act 1879. On 20 April 1887, the Borough of Hughenden was constituted separately as a municipality for the emerging town of Hughenden.

On 31 March  1903, the Hughenden Division became the Shire of Hughenden and the Borough of Hughenden became the Town of Hughenden under the Local Authorities Act 1902. On 5 September of the same year, the Shire of Hughenden was renamed Shire of Flinders.

The western part of the Shire was separately incorporated as the Shire of Wyangarie (later Shire of Richmond) on 23 October 1915. On 1 January 1930, part of the Shire of Flinders was annexed to the Shire of Dalrymple.

In 1958, the Town of Hughenden amalgamated with the Shire of Flinders.

Prior to 19 November 2021, the town of Marathon was within the locality of Stamford. However, this arrangement caused confusion, so on 19 November 2021, a new locality of Marathon was created around the town, excising the land from the localities of Dutton River and Stamford.

Towns and localities 
The Shire of Flinders includes the following settlements:

 Hughenden
 Dutton River
 Marathon
 Porcupine
 Prairie
 Stamford
 Tangorin
 Torrens Creek

Amenities 
The Flinders Shire Council operate the Flinders Shire Library at 39 Gray Street, Hughenden.

Population 

 ‡ – includes then-separate Town.

Chairmen and mayors

 1897: D. Simson 
 1927: E. M. Geary 
 2008–2012: Brendan McNamara (elected unopposed) 
 2012–2016: Greg Jones (elected unopposed) 
 2016–2020: Jane Beatrice McNamara

References

External links

 
 Flinders Shire historical photo project

 
Local government areas of Queensland
North West Queensland
1882 establishments in Australia